Paramore is an American rock band from Franklin, Tennessee formed in 2004. The band currently consists of Hayley Williams (lead vocals), Taylor York (guitar) and Zac Farro (drums). They have released five studio albums—All We Know Is Falling (2005), Riot! (2007), Brand New Eyes (2009), Paramore (2013) and After Laughter (2017)— with several certifications around the United States, United Kingdom and Australia. The band has released twenty three singles, including: "Misery Business", that became their first charting single in the US Billboard Hot 100, certified single, and in 2015, the band's first to be certified triple-platinum in the United States; "Ignorance", that become the first single to reach the top fifteen in the UK Singles Chart; and "Ain't It Fun", which was the band's first top ten single in the United States.

Paramore has received 25 awards from 69 nominations. They received one nomination on the American Music Award for New Artist of the Year and many other nominations in magazines awards and popular votes ceremonies. They single "Ain't It Fun" won the first Grammy Award for the band, out of four nominations, in the category Best Rock Song, that was awarded to the composers of the song, which are Hayley Williams and Taylor York. Paramore has received three MTV awards, including one MTV Europe Music Awards, one Los Premios MTV Latinoamérica and one MTV Video Music Brasil.

Awards and nominations

Notes

References

External links

Awards and nominations
Lists of awards received by American musician
Lists of awards received by musical group